Trevor Ogilvie-Grant, 4th Baron Strathspey (2 March 1879 – 11 November 1948) was born in New Zealand, the son of a Scottish peer. He inherited his father's subsidiary title under the Peerage of the United Kingdom and became the 4th Baron Strathspey, which gave him a seat in the House of Lords.

Strathspey was the second son of Francis Ogilvy-Grant, 10th Earl of Seafield and Ann Trevor Corry Evans. He was born in 1879 in Oamaru in North Otago. He was educated at Warwick House preparatory school in Christchurch (where his elder brother James had also attended), Waitaki Boys' High School and St John's College. For many years, he was the President of the English branch of the Waitaki Old Boys' Association.

He married Alice Louisa Hardy-Johnston, daughter of Thomas Masterman Hardy-Johnston of Christchurch, on 19 December 1905 in Tauranga. After his father's death, his mother and her family had lived in Tauranga for some time. Strathspey and his wife made Wellington their home after the wedding. They had two children in New Zealand: Lena Barbara Joan Ogilvie-Grant (1907–1981), and Donald Grant of Grant, 5th Baron Strathspey (1912–1992). His wife died on 18 November 1945.

His second marriage was in March 1947 to Elfrida Minnie Fass, daughter of Gordon Cloete of Cape Town in South Africa, and widow of Colonel Capron, York and Lancaster Regiment.

Baron Strathspey died on 11 November 1948. His second wife died on 19 July 1949.

References

1879 births
1948 deaths
People educated at Waitaki Boys' High School
Barons in the Peerage of the United Kingdom
People educated at St John's College, Auckland
Grant, Trevor Ogilvie-Grant, 11th Lord
Younger sons of earls